Sean Darcy (born 12 June 1998) is a professional Australian rules footballer playing for the Fremantle Football Club in the Australian Football League (AFL).

Early life
Originally from South Purrumbete, a farming area near Cobden, Darcy is the youngest of four children and attended Xavier College as a boarder. As a junior, Darcy played for the Cobden Football Club and was also a talented swimmer. In 2016 he played for the Geelong Falcons in the TAC Cup Under 18s competition, his school and for Victoria Country in the 2016 AFL Under 18 Championships.

AFL career
He was recruited by Fremantle with their second selection, 38th overall, in the 2016 AFL draft. He made his AFL debut in Round 14 of the 2017 AFL season, against Geelong at Simonds Stadium, after playing well for Fremantle's reserves team, Peel Thunder, in the West Australian Football League (WAFL). Darcy amassed 40 hit-outs in his debut game.  Due to his physical size and playing style, he is often compared to Shane Mumford. A breakout performance during the 2021 AFL season saw Darcy win his first Best and fairest award, the Doig Medal. Western Derby 55 saw Darcy amass a derby record 56 hit-outs during Fremantle's 24 point win over the West Coast Eagles.

Statistics
Updated to the end of the 2022 season.

|-
| 2017 ||  || 4
| 8 || 1 || 2 || 36 || 62 || 98 || 12 || 36 || 272 || 0.1 || 0.3 || 4.5 || 7.8 || 12.3 || 1.5 || 4.5 || 34.0 || 0
|-
| 2018 ||  || 4
| 7 || 2 || 3 || 20 || 45 || 65 || 15 || 29 || 233 || 0.3 || 0.4 || 2.9 || 6.4 || 9.3 || 2.1 || 4.1 || 33.3 || 0
|-
| 2019 ||  || 4
| 11 || 4 || 7 || 44 || 78 || 122 || 20 || 30 || 300 || 0.4 || 0.6 || 4.0 || 7.1 || 11.1 || 1.8 || 2.7 || 27.3 || 0
|-
| 2020 ||  || 4
| 15 || 5 || 6 || 42 || 92 || 134 || 25 || 26 || 330 || 0.3 || 0.4 || 2.8 || 6.1 || 8.9 || 1.7 || 1.7 || 22.0 || 0
|-
| 2021 ||  || 4
| 21 || 12 || 12 || 156 || 193 || 349 || 90 || 64 || 599 || 0.6 || 0.6 || 7.4 || 9.2 || 16.6 || 4.3 || 3.0 || 28.5 || 7
|-
| 2022 ||  || 4
| 21 || 10 || 9 || 147 || 150 || 297 || 51 || 55 || 712 || 0.5 || 0.4 || 7.0 || 7.1 || 14.1 || 2.4 || 2.6 || 33.9 || 6
|- class=sortbottom
! colspan=3 | Career
! 83 !! 34 !! 39 !! 445 !! 620 !! 1065 !! 213 !! 240 !! 2446 !! 0.4 !! 0.5 !! 5.4 !! 7.5 !! 12.8 !! 2.6 !! 2.9 !! 29.5 !! 13
|}

Notes

Honours and achievements
Individual
 Doig Medal: 2021
 Glendinning–Allan Medal: 2022 (round 22)
 2× 22under22 team: 2018, 2020

References

External links

1998 births
Living people
Fremantle Football Club players
Peel Thunder Football Club players
Geelong Falcons players
Australian rules footballers from Victoria (Australia)
People educated at Xavier College
Cobden Football Club players